Events from the year 1970 in Japan. It corresponds to Shōwa 45 (昭和45年) in the Japanese calendar.

Incumbents
Emperor: Shōwa
Prime Minister: Eisaku Satō (Liberal Democratic)
Chief Cabinet Secretary: Shigeru Hori
Chief Justice of the Supreme Court: Kazuto Ishida
President of the House of Representatives: Naka Funada from January 14
President of the House of Councillors: Yūzō Shigemune

Governors
Aichi Prefecture: Mikine Kuwahara 
Akita Prefecture: Yūjirō Obata 
Aomori Prefecture: Shunkichi Takeuchi 
Chiba Prefecture: Taketo Tomonō 
Ehime Prefecture: Sadatake Hisamatsu 
Fukui Prefecture: Heidayū Nakagawa 
Fukuoka Prefecture: Hikaru Kamei 
Fukushima Prefecture: Morie Kimura
Gifu Prefecture: Saburō Hirano 
Gunma Prefecture: Konroku Kanda 
Hiroshima Prefecture: Iduo Nagano 
Hokkaido: Kingo Machimura 
Hyogo Prefecture: Motohiko Kanai (until 23 November); Tokitada Sakai (starting 24 November)
Ibaraki Prefecture: Nirō Iwakami 
Ishikawa Prefecture: Yōichi Nakanishi 
Iwate Prefecture: Tadashi Chida 
Kagawa Prefecture: Masanori Kaneko 
Kagoshima Prefecture: Saburō Kanemaru 
Kanagawa Prefecture: Bunwa Tsuda 
Kochi Prefecture: Masumi Mizobuchi 
Kumamoto Prefecture: Kōsaku Teramoto 
Kyoto Prefecture: Torazō Ninagawa 
Mie Prefecture: Satoru Tanaka 
Miyagi Prefecture: Sōichirō Yamamoto 
Miyazaki Prefecture: Hiroshi Kuroki 
Nagano Prefecture: Gon'ichirō Nishizawa 
Nagasaki Prefecture: Katsuya Sato (until 1 March); Kan'ichi Kubo (starting 2 March)
Nara Prefecture: Ryozo Okuda 
Niigata Prefecture: Shiro Watari
Oita Prefecture: Kaoru Kinoshita 
Okayama Prefecture: Takenori Kato 
Osaka Prefecture: Gisen Satō 
Saga Prefecture: Sunao Ikeda 
Saitama Prefecture: Hiroshi Kurihara 
Shiga Prefecture: Kinichiro Nozaki 
Shiname Prefecture: Choemon Tanabe 
Shizuoka Prefecture: Yūtarō Takeyama 
Tochigi Prefecture: Nobuo Yokokawa 
Tokushima Prefecture: Yasunobu Takeichi 
Tokyo: Ryōkichi Minobe 
Tottori Prefecture: Jirō Ishiba 
Toyama Prefecture: Kokichi Nakada 
Wakayama Prefecture: Masao Ohashi 
Yamagata Prefecture: Tōkichi Abiko 
Yamaguchi Prefecture: Masayuki Hashimoto 
Yamanashi Prefecture: Kunio Tanabe

Events
March 15 – September 13 – Expo '70 in Osaka.
March 31 – Hijacking of Japan Airlines Flight 351
April 8 – Gas explosion at subway construction site in Osaka kills 79, injures over 400.
May 13 – According to Japan Coast Guard official confirmed report, a suspicion man shot dead by Japanese authority after two-days, with another all passengers and crew freed, a passenger ferry Prince hijacking off Kurushima Straight, Seto Inland Sea.
June 29 – According to Japan Fire and Disaster Management Agency official  confirmed report, a Ryōmō General hospital fire, resulting to 17 person fatalities with 10 person injures, in Sano, Tochigi Prefecture.
October – Mitsubishi Motors is founded. The Mitsubishi keiretsu had already begun making cars as far back as 1917, and Mitsubishi Heavy Industries had made many vehicles in the postwar era, but the actual company would not be founded until this date.
 November 25 – In Tokyo, author and Tatenokai militia leader Yukio Mishima and his followers take over the headquarters of the Japan Self-Defense Forces in an attempted coup d'état. After Mishima's speech fails to sway public opinion towards his right-wing political beliefs, including restoration of the powers of the Emperor, he commits seppuku (public ritual suicide).
December 20 - Koza riot: a violent and spontaneous protest against the US military presence in Okinawa. Roughly 5,000 Okinawans clashed with roughly 700 American MPs in an event which has been regarded as symbolic of Okinawan anger against 25 years of US military occupation.  In the riot, approximately 60 Americans were injured, 80 cars were burned, and several buildings on Kadena Air Base were destroyed or heavily damaged.
Unknown date – Oceanroutes Service Japan was founded, as predecessor of Japan Weather News, a meteorological service in nationwide.

Births

January 19 – Udo Suzuki, comedian
January 30 – Kimiya Yui, astronaut
February 18 – Junko Iwao, voice actress and singer
February 23 – Shoko Aida, J-pop artist and actress
March 1 – Miho Nakayama, singer and actress
March 21 – Shiho Niiyama, voice actress (d. 2000)
April 5 – Miho Hatori, singer-songwriter
April 14 – Shizuka Kudo, pop singer and actress
April 23 – Sadao Abe, actor
April 25 – Tomoko Kawakami, voice actress (d. 2011)
May 25 – Satsuki Yukino, voice actress,
May 26 – Nobuhiro Watsuki, manga artist
June 6 – Yoko Taro, video game designer
June 27 – Yumika Hayashi, pink film actress and AV idol (d. 2005)
August 3 – Masahiro Sakurai, creator of Kirby and Super Smash Bros.
September 8 – Motoko Kumai, voice actress
September 13 – Susumu Chiba, voice actor
September 19
Yuka Imai, voice actress
Takanori Nishikawa, singer
September 25
Aja Kong, professional wrestler
Misa Shimizu, actress
September 26 – Yukio Iketani, gymnast
September 27 – Yoshiharu Habu, professional shogi player
September 28 – Kimiko Date-Krumm, tennis player
September 29 – Yoshihiro Tajiri, professional wrestler
September 30 – Yūto Kazama, voice actor
October 8 – Tetsuya Nomura, video game creator and film director
October 14 – Hiromi Nagasaku, actress and singer
December 27 – Naoko Yamazaki, astronaut

Deaths
January 7 – Ken'ichi Enomoto, comedian and singer (b. 1904)
January 25 – Eiji Tsuburaya, film director and special effects designer (b. 1901)
May 7 – Mosaburō Suzuki,  journalist, essayist, and socialist politician (b. 1893)
May 19 – Haruo Oka, ryūkōka singer (b. 1916)
August 12 – Yaso Saijō, lyricist and poetry
November 25
Yukio Mishima, author, poet, and playwright (b. 1925)
Masakatsu Morita, political activist (b. 1945)

See also
 1970 in Japanese television
 List of Japanese films of 1970

References

 
1970s in Japan
Years of the 20th century in Japan